Yponomeuta gigas is a moth of the  family Yponomeutidae. It is found on the  Canary Islands.

The wingspan is 26–28 mm.

The larvae feed on Salix (including Salix canariensis) and Populus species (including Populus alba).

References

Moths described in 1892
Yponomeutidae